This article is about academic ranks in higher education in Australia and New Zealand. Both systems have derived from a common heritage in the British university system.

Overview in Australia

The system of academic titles and ranks in Australia is classified to a common five levels, A–E, although the titles of these levels may differ between institutions.  These are:

Level A — Tutor/Associate Lecturer/Research Associate
Level B — Lecturer/Research Fellow
Level C — Senior Lecturer/Senior Research Fellow
Level D — Associate Professor
Level E — Professor.

These levels correspond to salary levels set by the Australian government's Higher Education Academic Salaries Award (2002).
There has been a significant increase in academics at level D and E (Associate professor and professor) in recent years.  The number of academics at these levels increased by 70% from 1996 to 2008.

In order to receive the title of Professor, the applicant must pass each university's minimum standards statements and promotion policies, which are derived from the Higher Education Academic Salaries award.  Three key attributes are examined: recognition, distinction and leadership. Leadership in research is arguably the most important.  Some universities also expect leadership in developing the curriculum and in the teaching and management of staff and students.

The difference between professor and associate professor is that there is less of an imperative to demonstrate leadership qualities for the title of associate professor.  Still, in order to receive the title, it is required that the applicant has made an 'outstanding contribution' and that the applicant is usually recognised at a national or international level.

In some universities, the title of professor and associate professor can also be conferred with appointment to a senior management position without the need for an extensive academic record or a research higher degree.

Adjunct and conjoint professor are honorary titles bestowed upon a person to formally recognise that person's non-employment 'special relationship' with the university.

Emeritus professor is a title bestowed upon a retired person who has rendered distinguished service to the university.  They have nearly always held the title of professor at the university.  Half the universities in one study specified that the person needed to have served at least 10 years at the university.  Some universities have other titles such as Emeritus Educator and Emeritus Scholar.
Once the Emeritus Professor title is bestowed, the title is normally for life, though it can be repealed for failing to abide by university regulations.

Additional qualifiers such as Distinguished Professor or Laureate Professor may be conferred by universities upon Level E academics of high standing.

Overview in New Zealand

The system of academic titles in New Zealand is classified as follows:

Lecturer/Research Fellow
Senior Lecturer/Senior Research Fellow
Senior Lecturer (over the bar)/Senior Research Fellow (over the bar)
Associate Professor
Professor
Distinguished Professor

Teaching and research positions
Academic positions in Australia and New Zealand can be either continuing (permanent) or fixed-term (contract) appointments. Continuing appointments at the lecturer level and above are similar to the permanent academic posts found in the United Kingdom, and generally involve a 3-5 year probationary period.  Between 2009 and 2015, the University of Western Australia (UWA) used titles more aligned with North American academic titles, but reverted to standard Australian academic titles in 2015.

Salaries determined by the minimum and maximum salaries within each letter category offered to staff at the University of Queensland, University of Melbourne and University of Western Australia.

Research only positions
Professor - senior principal research fellow (level E)
Associate professor - principal research fellow (level D)
Senior research fellow (level C)
Research fellow (level B)
Research associate (level A)

The Australian public service or government organisations also employ a large number of academics or researchers. Different organisations have their own established title systems (e.g., principal scientist, senior officer etc.). However, it is the level rather than the title that determines the equivalent academic rank. With Commonwealth Scientific & Industry Research Organisation (CSIRO), levels for Research Scientists and Research Engineers are as follows:
Level 4 (Postdoctoral Fellow), equivalent to academic level A or postdoctoral researcher;
Level 5 (Research Scientist), equivalent to academic level B;
Level 6 (Senior Research Scientist), equivalent to academic level C;
Level 7 (Principal Research Scientist), equivalent to academic level D;
Level 8 (Senior Principal Research Scientist), equivalent to academic level E;
Level 9 (Chief Research Scientist).

Most state governments use similar levels, but may use different titles.
CSIRO uses the same levels but different titles for other functional roles, including Research Management, Research Projects and Research Consulting. These roles are less directly analogous to academic positions, though Research Management roles at levels 7 and 8 could be equated to Associate Dean and Dean roles at universities.

The Western Australian state government introduced a specified calling system in 2008. Within this system,
SC-level 1, equivalent to postdoctoral fellow or associate lecturer;
SC-level 2, equivalent to lecturer or research scientist;
SC-level 3, equivalent to senior lecturer or senior scientist;
SC-level 4, equivalent to associate professor;
SC-level 5, equivalent to professor;
SC-level 6, chief.

Administrative ranks
Visitor (titular)
Chancellor (titular)
Deputy chancellor / pro-chancellor (titular)
Vice-chancellor
Provost
Deputy vice-chancellor
Pro-vice-chancellor (could be the faculty dean)
Registrar (education) (there is not necessarily such a position)
Faculty dean (normally professor)
Faculty deputy dean; associate dean (normally professor, associate professor or reader)
Head of school and Head of Department (normally professor, associate professor, or reader)
Program director (normally senior lecturer or above)
Course coordinator (lecturer and above)

See also
List of academic ranks

References 

Academic ranks
Higher education in Australia
Higher education in New Zealand
Ranks
Ranks